Dairi Kovae is a Papua New Guinean former professional rugby league footballer who played in the 1980s. He played for the second division North Sydney Bears in 1988 and the Newcastle Knights in 1989. He played for Papua New Guinea from 1986 to 1989.

His rugby league career started with his local village team, Porebada DCA. Played in the Port Moresby rugby league competition. Won the comps grand final in 1986 and scouted straight to North Sydney Bears in 1988 and transferred to the Newcastle Knights in 1989.

Playing career
 Porebada DCA - 1985-1986
 North Sydney Bears Reserve grade - 1988
 Newcastle Knights (first grade Debut, Round 2) - 1989
 Rest of the World Team - 1988
 PNG Kumuls - 1986-1989

External links
Statistics at rugbyleagueproject.org

Living people
Newcastle Knights players
North Sydney Bears NSW Cup players
Other Nationalities rugby league team players
Papua New Guinea national rugby league team players
Papua New Guinean people
Papua New Guinean rugby league players
Year of birth missing (living people)
Rugby league fullbacks
Rugby league wingers
Rugby league centres